The 132nd district of the Texas House of Representatives contains parts of Harris County. The current Representative is Mike Schofield, who was first elected in 2020.

References 

132